Tongxing Township is a rural township in Lengshuijiang, Loudi City, Hunan Province, People's Republic of China.

Administrative division
The township is divided into 6 villages and 3 communities, the following areas: Chongbei Community, Xinqiao Community, Liatang Community, Baishi Village, Baiyang Village, Tanjia Village, Tongxin Village, Yanli Village, and Yongxing Village (崇北社区、新桥社区、俩塘社区、白石村、白杨村、谭家村、同心村、岩里村、永兴村)

Historic township-level divisions of Lengshuijiang